The women's team foil was one of eight fencing events on the fencing at the 1976 Summer Olympics programme. It was the fifth appearance of the event. The competition was held from 27 to 28 July 1976. 61 fencers from 13 nations competed.

Rosters

Results

Round 1

Round 1 Pool A 

Poland and the Soviet Union each defeated Canada, 9–7 and 14–2, respectively. The two victors then faced off. The Soviet Union won 9–2.

Round 1 Pool B 

Romania and France each defeated Cuba, 8–8 (66–60 touches advantage breaking the bouts tie) and 11–5, respectively. The two victors then faced each other for placement, with France winning 9–6.

Round 1 Pool C 

West Germany and Hungary each defeated Japan, 10–6 and 12–4, respectively. The two victors then faced each other for placement, with Hungary winning 8–6 (after 14 bouts, Hungary had a 60–49 touches advantage, so West Germany would still lose the tie-breaker even if it won the final 2 bouts 5–0 each time).

Round 1 Pool D 

In the first set of pairings, Italy defeated Iran 13–3 and Great Britain beat the United States 9–7. The second set of matches saw the first-set winners both go to 2–0 and the first-set losers go to 0–2, cementing advancement as Italy prevailed over the United States 14–2 and Great Britain won against Iran 9–7. The third set only determined final placement; Italy defeated Great Britain 9–2 to take the top place (with Great Britain second) while the United States beat Iran 11–5 to finish third (over Iran in fourth).

Elimination rounds

References

Foil team
1976 in women's fencing
Fen